Rodolfo Cazaubón Jr. (born 5 August 1989) is a Mexican professional golfer who currently plays on the Web.com Tour.

Amateur career
Cazaubón played college golf at the University of North Texas where he won three tournaments in his senior year and was an All-American in 2013. He played on the Mexican team in the 2010 and 2012 Eisenhower Trophy. The 2012 team finished second to the United States by five strokes. He also played on the Mexican team in the 2011 World University Games, helping the team to a bronze medal.

Professional career
Cazaubón turned professional in 2013 and largely played on PGA Tour Latinoamérica during the 2014 season. His best result during his inaugural season as a professional was a second place at the 2014 Mundo Maya Open.

During the 2015 PGA Tour Latinoamérica season, Cazaubón won his first Official World Golf Ranking points event at the Lexus Panama Classic He followed this up with his second win on the tour at the Dominican Republic Open in June 2015. Cazaubón earned his third win of the season at the Lexus Peru Open and finished 2015 leading the Tour's Order of Merit, making him fully exempt for the 2016 Web.com Tour. He represented Mexico in Rio 2016 Olympic games

Professional wins (6)

PGA Tour Latinoamérica wins (4)

Gira de Golf Profesional Mexicana wins (2)

Team appearances
Amateur
 Eisenhower Trophy (representing Mexico): 2010, 2012

Professional
Aruba Cup (representing PGA Tour Latinoamérica): 2017

References

External links
 
 

Mexican male golfers
North Texas Mean Green men's golfers
PGA Tour Latinoamérica golfers
Olympic golfers of Mexico
Golfers at the 2016 Summer Olympics
Universiade medalists in golf
Universiade bronze medalists for Mexico
Medalists at the 2011 Summer Universiade
Sportspeople from Tampico, Tamaulipas
1989 births
Living people
21st-century Mexican people